is a passenger railway station located in the city of Matsuyama, Ehime Prefecture, Japan. It is operated by the private transportation company Iyotetsu.

Lines
During most of the day, trains arrive every fifteen minutes. Trains continue from Matsuyama City Station on the Takahama Line to Takahama Station.

Layout
The station consists of one island platform connected to the station building by a level crossing. The station is attended.

History
Kume Station was opened on 7 May 1893. In April 1981 the station was relocate 170 meters towards Matsuyama City in order to extend the effective length of the platform to handle a 4-car trains.

Surrounding area
Matsuyama City Hall Kume Branch
Jōdo-ji, 49th temple on the Shikoku Pilgrimage
Hatan-ji, 50th temple on the Shikoku Pilgrimage

See also
 List of railway stations in Japan

References

External links

Iyotetsu Station Information

Iyotetsu Yokogawara Line
Railway stations in Ehime Prefecture
Railway stations in Japan opened in 1893
Railway stations in Matsuyama, Ehime